Laurent-Michel Eon de Cely (born in Bayeux 25 September 1735 and died in Marseille December 12, 1815), was the last bishop of Apt from 1778 to 1801.

Early life
Laurent-Michel Eon de Cely, son of Baron Michel Eon († 1780), and his wife Marie-Thérèse Dorothée de Faudoas, born in the parish of Saint-Sauveur, Bayeux. Tonsured March 3, 1747, he was made in 1756 as lord commendatory prior of the Priory of La Valette-lès-Toulon which he resigned in 1786. He became vicar general of the Bishop of Autun Yves Alexandre Marbeuf.

He was made bishop of Apt in 1778, and dedicated in January 1779 in Issy. In his diocese, he removes the seminar and introduced the Parisian Breviary. 
During the French Revolution, he fled to Italy on August 24, 1789, he arrived in Rome in October where he devoted himself to the study of antiquities. After signing the Concordat of 1801, he resigned his diocese to the Pope on 11 November 1801 and returned to France.  He died on 16 December 1815 in Marseille.

References

1735 births
1815 deaths
People from Bayeux
Bishops of Apt